The Other America is Michael Harrington's best known and likely most influential book. He was an American democratic socialist, writer, political activist, political theorist, professor of political science, radio commentator, and founding member of the Democratic Socialists of America. He believed that American Socialists could support certain Democratic Party candidates, including candidates for president.

Synopsis
The book was a study of poverty in the United States, published in 1962 by the Macmillan Publishing Company.

President Dwight Eisenhower's two terms from 1952 to 1960 had temporarily upended the New Deal Coalition, which had been begun by President Franklin Roosevelt and was revived, at least in spirit, by the election of John F. Kennedy as president in 1960.

Reception
A widely read review, "Our Invisible Poor," in The New Yorker by Dwight Macdonald brought the book to the attention of President Kennedy. The Other America argued that up to 25% of the nation was living in poverty. Many (such as historian Maurice Isserman) believe that this book was responsible for President Lyndon Johnson's "War on Poverty." The Penguin Books paperback editions have sold over one million copies. The Boston Globe editorialized that Medicaid, Medicare, food stamps, and expanded social security benefits could partly be traced to Harrington's ideas.

With the book's acceptance, many believe Harrington became the pre-eminent spokesman for democratic socialism in America. By 1980, Harrington considered a run for President himself, but he threw his support to Democratic candidates instead.

Documentary film

The 1999 documentary film Michael Harrington and Today's Other America: Corporate Power and Inequality captured the essence of Harrington's ideas through the use of archival footage and interviews with his colleagues and opponents. Over thirty interviews were filmed, including John Kenneth Galbraith, Gloria Steinem, William F. Buckley, Charles Murray, and ordinary people who struggle to make a living or are dependent on social services.

The documentary included a brief history of socialism in America and raised questions on the merits and relevance of trade unions today; the problems of migrant workers, farmers, and big business; and the American health care system.

See also
 Two Americas
Socialism for the rich and capitalism for the poor

References

1962 non-fiction books
Sociology books
Urban decay in the United States
Books about poverty
1962 in the United States
Social history of the United States
Poverty in the United States
Socialism in the United States